The Ministry of Justice of Moldova is one of the fourteen ministries of the Government of Moldova. The current justice minister is Veronica Mihailov-Moraru.

Ministers

See also
 Justice ministry
 Politics of Moldova

References

External links

Justice
Moldova
Moldova, Justice